The Marvel Cinematic Universe (MCU) is an American media franchise and shared universe centered on superhero films and other series starring various titular superheroes independently produced by Marvel Studios and based on characters that appear in American comic books published by Marvel Comics. The shared universe, much like the original Marvel Universe in comic books, was established by crossing over common plot elements, settings, cast, and characters. Due to the galaxy-spanning nature of the franchise, multiple species have been introduced.

Main species

Asgardians

The Asgardians, or the Æsir, introduced in the Thor, are the inhabitants of Asgard, on whom the gods of Norse mythology are based in MCU mythology. In the first film they are shown as a race of extraterrestrials similar in appearance to humans, possessing a highly advanced form of technology resembling magic and sorcery, upon which their entire civilization is built. However, later films contradict this, with Thor: Love and Thunder establishing that Thor and Zeus are actual gods in the fictional universe. The film's post-credit scene also confirms the existence of Valhala in the MCU.

The Asgardians are shown suffering major losses, first during Hela's attempt to harness Asgard's power in Thor: Ragnarok, and later by Thanos on his quest to retrieve the Tessaract, as revealed in Avengers: Infinity War. A group of survivors escapes to Earth, and build a settlement under the rule of King Valkyrie.

They appear in the films Thor, The Avengers, Thor: The Dark World, Avengers: Age of Ultron, Doctor Strange, Thor: Ragnarok, Avengers: Infinity War, Avengers: Endgame and Thor: Love and Thunder; as well as the ABC series Agents of S.H.I.E.L.D., the Disney+ series Loki and the animated series What If...?.

Celestials

Celestials are an ancient race of entities introduced in Guardians of the Galaxy and later expanded upon on Guardians of the Galaxy Vol. 2 and Eternals as beings with vast matter and energy manipulation abilities.

In Guardians of the Galaxy, they are introduced as being present in the universe long before the galactic communities and even the Asgardians. Their origin and nature are not elaborated upon. Whatever is known about them is known only by a few characters, such as Taneleer Tivan, who reveals that the Celestials utilized the Infinity Stones as a means of power against lesser life forms. The severed head of a deceased Celestial, which was converted into Knowhere, appears in this film and Avengers: Infinity War.

Eson the Searcher is shown in a flashback sequence as a former owner of the Power Stone in Guardians of the Galaxy. He uses its power to level the surface of an entire planet.

In Guardians of the Galaxy Vol. 2, Ego the Living Planet, Star-Lord's biological father, is a Celestial who controls a humanoid avatar to travel the universe. His planetary form is a living extension of his Celestial consciousness. Over the course of many years, he plants thousands of alien-seedlings to expand his existence across all life sustaining planets. However, Ego needs another Celestial's assistance to activate them, so he fathers children with various alien races and had Yondu Udonta retrieve them so he could gauge their Celestial powers. Quill is the only child who gains his father's Celestial abilities, though he loses them after killing Ego and foiling his plans.

In Eternals, Arishem the Celestial is revealed to have planted seeds of other Celestials in planets with life for millions of years, and created and dispatched Deviants and Eternals to prepare the planets for their birth. After the Eternals of Earth defy his orders and stop the birth of Celestial Tiamut, their remaining members are taken away by Arishem for judgement.

Celestials also appear in the Disney+ animated series What If...?.

Chitauri

The Chitauri are a powerful, reptilian warrior race, introduced in The Avengers as a hybrid between organic beings and machines. They have a caste-like society, with each caste (nearly a different species in itself) fulfilling a different role in Chitauri society. They are in league with Thanos through his vizier, a hooded being called "the Other". They are presented as a race of grey-skinned, six-fingered reptilian humanoids that have a bio-mechanical physiology and superhuman attributes. Their technology ranges from hovercraft-like skimmers and Necrocraft, to living airborne troop carriers called Leviathans, all neurally linked with a mothership.

 In The Avengers, the Other, acting on behalf of Thanos, lends the Chitauri to Loki for the invasion of Earth, leading to the Battle of New York. While they eventually overwhelm the Avengers, Iron Man destroys the mothership with a hijacked nuclear missile with the invading forces dropping dead instantly from the mental feedback.
 In Guardians of the Galaxy, the Other briefly appears where he contacts Ronan the Accuser and Nebula about Gamora's betrayal, and calls them to the Sanctuary on behalf of Thanos. Once the two of them appear, Ronan argues his case to Thanos while The Other scolds him for his failure, and is then promptly killed by Ronan. A Chitauri soldier is also seen as a prisoner in the Collector's museum.
 In Avengers: Age of Ultron, Chitauri technology is being studied and used by a Hydra faction led by Baron Strucker– many of his troops wear suits and use weapons made of Chitauri armor, and Strucker's hidden lab houses the remains of a Leviathan. Furthermore, as first hinted in the psychological trauma shown in Iron Man 3 and augmented by Scarlet Witch's powers giving him a nightmarish vision, Tony Stark is fearful that the Chitauri may eventually return to Earth, which leads to his rash actions in creating Ultron.
 In Spider-Man: Homecoming, alongside the technology of the Dark Elves and Stark Industries, the Chitauri technology is used by Adrian Toomes and his cohorts, who steal it from Damage Control and modify it into weapons to sell on the black market, and to forge technology such as Vulture's flight suit and Shocker's gauntlets.
 In Avengers: Infinity War, the Chitauri are Thanos' enforcers in his mission to obtain the Infinity Stones. It is also revealed in a flashback that the Chitauri took part in the invasion of Gamora's home planet when she was a child, resulting in her being taken in by Thanos.
 In an alternate version of the Battle of New York shown in Avengers: Endgame, Chitauri are seen fighting as they did in the original depiction of the battle. In present-day 2023, alternate versions of the Chitauri and their Leviathans are brought to fight in the Battle of Earth. While some Chitauri and Leviathans are slain, the rest are taken out by Iron Man using the Stark Gauntlet.

They also appear in the Disney+ series Loki (archival footage), What If...?, and Hawkeye.

Clandestines

The Clandestines, introduced in Ms. Marvel, are a group who claim to be Djinns that were exiled from their home Noor dimension. Their presence on Earth is shown to be tied to the background of series protagonist Kamala Khan and her family. Kamala's great-grandmother Aisha is revealed to be a former Clandestines in a flashback sequence set in the period upto the Partition of India. In 1942 Aisha leaves the group, falls in love with a human man named Hasan, and gives birth to Sana, Kamala's grandmother. In 1947, the other Clandestines find Aisha, and their leader, Najma, kills her. The other members include Fariha, Aadam, Saleem, and Kamran, who tries to protect Kamala from the other Clandestines when they attempt to forcibly use her to return home.

The Clandestines appear in the Disney+ series Ms. Marvel.

Deviants

Deviants are a race of organic beings introduced in Eternals, created by the Celestial Arishem. Like Eternals, they are sent to planets to ensure the development of intelligent life, creating the necessary conditions to birth a Celestial. Deviants achieve this by eliminating the apex predators of planets, allowing populations to grow. However, unlike Eternals, Deviants evolve, and eventually become a threat to intelligent life themselves. Eternals are revealed to have been sent as replacements with the additional mission to eliminate Deviants.

On Earth, Deviants are believed to have been eliminated by Eternals led by Ajak in 1521, until their resurgence in 2024. One of these Deviants, Kro, kills Eternals Ajak and Gilgamesh and absorbs their abilities.

Dwarves

Dwarves, introduced in Avengers: Infinity War, are an ancient race of skilled forgers and blacksmiths hailing from the realm of Nidavellir. They are ruled by King Eitri. They are close allies of the Asgardians, and after being asked by Odin, forged Mjolnir. Unlike the comics, Eitri was shown to be larger than normal.

Eitri appears in Avengers: Infinity War, when Thor, Rocket, and Groot arrive on Nidavellir. They find Eitri who informs them that Thanos killed the rest of the Dwarves after they forged the Infinity Gauntlet.

Dwarves also appear in the Disney+ series What If...?.

Elves

Elves are two separate races, the Dark Elves of Svartalfheim, and the Light Elves of Alfheim.

In Thor: The Dark World, The Dark Elves, as with their enemies the Asgardians, are depicted as ancient astronauts. It is stated that they existed in the primordial darkness that predated the current vibrant state of the universe. Their goal is stated as destroying the current universe and returning existence back to that state. They were believed extinct, but unbeknownst to the Asgardians, Malekith and a number of warriors escaped and went into stasis in deep space until another attempt would be possible. For the film, David J. Peterson created a language for the Dark Elves called Shiväisith. In Guardians of the Galaxy, an imprisoned Dark Elf appears as an exhibit in Taneleer Tivan's museum. In Spider-Man: Homecoming, Dark Elf technology that was salvaged from the Battle of Greenwich was used by Tinkerer alongside the technologies from the Chitauri and Stark Industries.

Runa, a Light Elf with shape shifting abilities, appears in She-Hulk: Attorney at Law. After impersonating various people including Megan Thee Stallion, she is caught and sentenced to pay damages and serve a 60 day sentence.

Elves also appear in the Disney+ series Loki (archival footage) and What If...?.

Eternals

Eternals are an immortal race of superpowered synthetic beings appearing in the film of the same name. They are revealed to have been created by the Celestials at the World Forge to rid planets of Deviants in order to ensure the continual growth of their native populations, allowing new Celestials to "emerge" when the time comes. A group of ten Eternals—Ajak, Sersi, Ikaris, Kingo, Sprite, Phastos, Makkari, Druig, Gilgamesh, and Thena—are sent to Earth on their starship, the Domo, by Arishem in 5000 BC, where they help humanity progress while refraining from interfering in human conflicts. In the present day, this group of Eternals rebel once they learn of their true purpose, with Ajak being betrayed by Ikaris and her and Gilgamesh both being killed by Deviants in the process. Sersi replaces Ajak as the team's leader and activates the Uni-Mind, successfully preventing the Celestial Tiamut from being born and destroying the planet. A guilt-ridden Ikaris, who had vowed to uphold Arishem's instructions but was unable to bring himself to kill Sersi, flies into the Sun, while Sprite is turned into a human.

Flerken

The Flerken, introduced in Captain Marvel, are stated to be alien creatures that completely resemble Earth's cats in appearance and behavior, but are shown to possess human-level intelligence. They have tentacles that come out of their mouths and can swallow up large objects and store them in pocket dimensions in their bellies. Flerken also have longevity.

Goose is the Flerken that makes her appearance in Captain Marvel. She accompanies Carol Danvers and Nick Fury on their mission, where she demonstrates her abilities by defeating Kree soldiers and swallowing the Tesseract. Later, she stays with Fury.

Frost Giants

The Frost Giants, introduced in Thor, are a race of 10 ft. tall humanoid beings that inhabit the frozen, barren realm Jotunheim. They are ruled by Laufey, king of the Frost Giants, who is also Loki's true biological father. Small and weak for a Frost Giant, Loki is abandoned by his father in a temple, and left to die. In 965 A.D., not long after the war between the Giants and the Asgardians, Loki is found by King Odin and raised as his son.

After Thor, they also appear through Loki in the films The Avengers, Thor: The Dark World, Thor: Ragnarok, Avengers: Infinity War and Avengers: Endgame, as well as the Disney+ series Loki and What If...?.

Kree

The Kree are a militaristic race of mostly blue-skinned humanoids from the planet Hala, first featured in the ABC series Agents of S.H.I.E.L.D. One of the most technically advanced races in the galaxy, the Kree are skilled in genetic engineering and are responsible for the creation of the Inhumans on Earth.

The species made its cinematic debut in Guardians of the Galaxy with Ronan the Accuser and Korath the Pursuer. The Kree Empire is stated to have just signed a peace treaty with the Nova Corps of Xandar, thereby ending a centuries-long war between the two races. This treaty prompts the radical Ronan to embark on a renegade campaign of genocide against all Xandarians, before being defeated and killed by Guardians of the Galaxy.

The Kree briefly appear in Guardians of the Galaxy Vol. 2, where their planet Hala is nearly destroyed by Ego.

They next appear in Captain Marvel. Pace and Hounsou reprise their roles as Ronan and Korath, and are joined by Yon-Rogg, Minn-Erva, Att-Lass, and Bron-Char, who are members of the Kree military team Starforce. Mar-Vell and the Supreme Intelligence also appear in the film. Yon-Rogg comes to Earth when the Kree discovers that Mar-Vell is working on a light-speed engine experiment as well as harboring some Skrulls. When Mar-Vell dies in a crash with Carol Danvers and Yon-Rogg arrives, Carol shoots the engine and gets exposed to its energies. After a blood transfusion from Yon-Rogg, Carol's memories are altered and she works under him and the Supreme Intelligence. Carol then comes back to Earth following an encounter with the Skrulls led by Talos. On a parley with Talos, Carol learns of what the Kree did to the Skrulls and their homeworld. After removing the dampener from her head, Carol uses her powers to fight the Kree forces, resulting in most of them either being killed or incapacitated. Yon-Rogg is sent back to Hala to relay Carol's message to the Supreme Intelligence.

The Kree also appear in Avengers: Endgame as well as the and the Disney+ animated series What If...?.

Outriders

The Outriders are mindless, feral aliens utilized by Thanos in his army, first appearing in Avengers: Infinity War, in which they invade Wakanda. Alternate versions of the Outriders appear in Avengers: Endgame during the final battle, but are disintegrated at the end.

The non-canon novel Thanos: Titan Consumed gives their origin as the result of Thanos combining samples of DNA from the Chitauri, himself, and of various species that he has killed.

Sakaarans

Sakaarans, also known as Sakaarians, are a sentient insectoid race native to the planet Sakaar.

 They make their first appearance in Guardians of the Galaxy, working for Ronan the Accuser. A maskless member of the race is portrayed by James Gunn.
 A separate type, larva-like creatures, appears in Thor: Ragnarok, Thor: Love and Thunder, and Avengers: Endgame., in the form of Miek.

The species also appears in the Disney+ animated series What If...?

Skrulls

The Skrulls are a race of extraterrestrial shapeshifters hailing from the planet Skrullos, introduced in Captain Marvel.

 In the film, Talos (portrayed by Ben Mendelsohn) is the leader of the Skrulls. A faction of Skrulls led by Talos are victims of a genocidal war waged by the Kree, having come to Earth to seek the aid of renegade Kree scientist Mar-Vell in devising a light-speed engine that could take the Skrulls to safety. After Kree warrior "Vers" learns of her true identity as Carol Danvers, she helps defend Talos and the other Skrull refugees from a Kree attack before they leave Earth to find a new planet to settle on.
 In WandaVision, a Skrull posing as an FBI agent informs Monica Rambeau that an "old friend" of her mother would like to meet her.
 In Spider-Man: Far From Home, Talos and his wife Soren  pose as Nick Fury and Maria Hill on Earth while the real Fury works with a group of Skrulls in space.
 The Skrulls will be featured heavily in the Disney+ series Secret Invasion.

They appear in the Disney+ series Loki, and What If...?.

Sovereign

The Sovereign, appearing in Guardians of the Galaxy Vol. 2, are a golden-skinned humanoid race that has advanced through genetic engineering and live on the amalgamation of planets of the same name. They are led by Ayesha, the Golden High Priestess. In a post-credits scene in, Ayesha oversees the birth of the latest member of the race—Adam Warlock, who she intends to use as a weapon against the Guardians.

They appear in the film Guardians of the Galaxy Vol. 2 and the Disney+ series What If...?.

Talokanil

The Talokanil, introduced in Black Panther: Wakanda Forever, are the inhabitants of the underwater kingdom of Talokan. They are descended from an enhanced group of humans from Yucatán who consumed an underwater herb infused with vibranium.

Other species
Several other species make appearances throughout the MCU, often in the form of a single character. These include:

 Chinese dragons (Great Protector)
 Flora Colossus (Groot)
 Fire Demons of Muspelheim (Surtur)
 Halfworlder raccoon (Rocket)
 Hundun (Morris)
 Inhumans (Black Bolt)
 Insectoids (Mantis)
 Korbinites
 Kronans (Korg)
 Krylorians (Carina, Bereet)
 Kylosians (Drax)
 Luphomoids (Nebula)
 Mutants (Charles Xavier, Kamala Khan, Namor)
 Olympians (Zeus, Hercules, Dionysus)
 Symbiotes (Venom)
 Titans (Thanos)
 Vanir (Hogun)
 Watchers (The Watcher)
 Xandarians (Kraglin Obfonteri, Irani Rael, Rhomann Dey, Garthan Saal)
 Zehoberei (Gamora)

See also
 Characters of the Marvel Cinematic Universe
 Features of the Marvel Cinematic Universe
 Teams and organizations of the Marvel Cinematic Universe

References 

Lists of fictional species
Marvel Cinematic Universe features
Marvel Cinematic Universe lists